Hypena malagasy is a moth of the family Erebidae first described by Pierre Viette in 1968. It is native to central eastern Madagascar.

This species has a wingspan of 34 mm. The basic colour of its wings is violet brown or chocolate brown.

References

Moths described in 1968
malagasy
Moths of Madagascar
Moths of Africa